Nils Röseler (born 10 February 1992) is a German professional footballer who plays as a centre-back for Eerste Divisie club Roda JC.

Club career

Twente
Röseler started playing football for hometown club SV Bad Bentheim. He was later scouted by Dutch club Twente and joined their youth academy. In January 2010, he signed a youth contract with the club, and on 23 July 2011, Röseler signed his first professional contract: a three-year deal.

Röseler made his debut in professional football on 14 December 2011, when he played a UEFA Europa League for Twente against Wisła Kraków. Head coach Co Adriaanse had placed him in the starting line-up – the team had at that point already clinched advancement as group winners. He made his Eredivisie debut on 19 February 2012, in a match against Vitesse, replacing Willem Janssen in the 92nd minute. On 18 March 2012, he was in the starting line-up for the first time due to an injury to Peter Wisgerhof and a suspension to Douglas, the regular starters. He scored an own goal that match, which was lost 2–0 to Feyenoord. While Röseler slowly broke into the first team, he also won the Beloften Eredivisie championship with the reserves. For the first team, he made 11 appearances in the 2011–12 season.

In the following season, Röseler was permanently promoted to the first team. Twente sent him on a one-season loan to VVV-Venlo in August 2012. There, he made 29 total appearances as the club suffered relegation to the Eerste Divisie.

After returning from VVV in 2013, he spent the next season playing for Jong Twente in the Eerste Divisie. He scored in his first match for the side after returning, opening the score with a header on 5 August 2013 in a 3–0 victory against FC Oss.

Chemnitzer FC
In June 2014, Röseler was released and he signed a two-year contract with 3. Liga club Chemnitzer FC. He made his debut for the club on 26 July 2014, the first matchday of the 2014–15 season, starting in a 3–0 away win over Hallescher FC at the Erdgas Sportpark.

Röseler made 66 appearances in the 3. Liga for Die Himmelblauen in the next two seasons. His contract was not extended as it expired in June 2016, making him a free agent.

VVV-Venlo
Röseler returned to his former club, VVV-Venlo, on 28 June 2016, this time on a permanent, two-year contract with an option for another season. He became a key player in defense for VVV and helped them to promotion to the Eredivisie in his first season back, as the club won the second division title.

Röseler remained an important player for the club from Venlo in the Eredivisie, and the club exercised the option to extend him another season on 28 March 2018. He was in the starting line-up in all VVV's Eredivisie games during the 2017–18 season, and on 15 May 2018 he signed a two-year contract extension keeping him at the club until 2020.

He left the club as his contract expired in June 2022. During his four-year stint at the club, Röseler made 135 total appearances for VVV in which he scored three goals. He grew into vice-captain for the club.

SV Sandhausen
On 16 June 2020, it was announced that Röseler would join 2. Bundesliga side SV Sandhausen on a free transfer for the 2020–21 season having agreed to a two-year contract. He made his debut for the club on 13 September 2020, starting in a 2–1 away win over TSV Steinbach in the DFB-Pokal. His 2. Bundesliga debut came in 19 September 2020, coming on as a substitute in the 92nd minute for Daniel Keita-Ruel in a 3–2 home victory against Darmstadt.

Röseler left Sandhausen on 17 August 2021, as his contract was terminated by mutual consent. He failed to become a permanent starter for the club, making 25 total appearances for the club in which he scored two goals.

FC Ingolstadt
After being a free agent for one day, Röseler joined FC Ingolstadt, who had recently won promotion from the 3. Liga, on 18 August 2021. He also failed to become a key player for Die Schanzer, making 16 appearances that season of which 12 as a starter.

Roda JC
Röseler returned to the Netherlands and joined Eerste Divisie club Roda JC on 11 July 2022. He signed a three-year contract with an option for an additional season. He made his debut for the club on 5 August 2022, starting in a 2–0 away win over Dordrecht on the first matchday of the 2022–23 season. On 5 February 2023, in a local derby against MVV, Röseler scored his first goal for Roda, equalizing in an eventual 2–1 home win.

International career
Röseler gained his first cap for the Germany under-18s on 14 December 2009 in a 6–3 win over Hungary, replacing Boné Uaferro in the 81st minute. He made eight appearances for the Germany U18s.

Career statistics

Honours
Jong Twente
 Beloften Eredivisie: 2011–12

VVV-Venlo
 Eerste Divisie: 2016–17

References

External links
 
 Nils Röseler at kicker.de 
 

Living people
1992 births
People from Bentheim
Association football defenders
German footballers
Germany youth international footballers
German expatriate footballers
German expatriate sportspeople in the Netherlands
Expatriate footballers in the Netherlands
Jong FC Twente players
FC Twente players
VVV-Venlo players
Chemnitzer FC players
SV Sandhausen players
FC Ingolstadt 04 players
Roda JC Kerkrade players
Eredivisie players
Eerste Divisie players
2. Bundesliga players
Oberliga (football) players
3. Liga players
Footballers from Lower Saxony